Chillemi is an Italian surname. Notable people with the surname include:

Claudio Chillemi (born 1964), Italian writer
Francesca Chillemi (born 1985), Italian actress, model, television personality, and beauty pageant winner
Franco Chillemi (1942–2011), Italian actor and voice actor

Italian-language surnames